The men's big air competition of the 2018 Winter Olympics was held on 21 and 24 February 2018 at the Alpensia Ski Jumping Stadium in Pyeongchang, South Korea. The event was making its Olympic debut.

Due to a broken shoulder caused by a crash in training for the slopestyle, Niek van der Velden was not able to compete.

Qualification

The top 40 athletes in the Olympic quota allocation list qualified (for both big air and slopestyle, the rankings were combined). This meant only a maximum of 40 could qualify across both events. A maximum of four athletes per National Olympic Committee (NOC) was allowed. All athletes qualifying must also have placed in the top 30 of a FIS World Cup event (in either big air or slopestyle) or the FIS Freestyle Ski and Snowboarding World Championships 2017 during the qualification period (1 July 2016 to 21 January 2018) and also have a minimum of 50 FIS points to compete. If the host country, South Korea, did not qualify, their chosen athlete would displace the last qualified athlete, granted all qualification criterion was met.

Results

Key
 Q — Qualified for the Final
 DNS — Did Not Start
 JNS — Jump Not Scored

Heat 1

Heat 2

Final
The final was held on 24 February 2018.

References

Men's snowboarding at the 2018 Winter Olympics